John Kingdon may refer to:
 John W. Kingdon, American political scientist
 John Abernethy Kingdon, British surgeon and historian

See also
 Johnny Kingdom (Walter John Kingdon), English wildlife filmmaker and photographer